The Steacie Prize is a scientific prize awarded to a person of 40 years or younger who has made notable contributions to research in Canada. It was first awarded in 1964, to Jan Van Kranendonk, and it has since been given annually. The award is named in honor of Edgar William Richard Steacie and is funded from the E.W.R. Steacie Memorial Fund, which was established via contributions from colleagues and friends of Edgar William Richard Steacie.

Steacie Prize Winners 
Source: Steacie Prize Recipient List

References

External links 
Steacie Prize website

Canadian science and technology awards